The Patria of Constantinople, also regularly referred to by the Latin name Scriptores originum Constantinopolitarum ("writers on the origins of Constantinople"), are a Byzantine collection of historical works on the history and monuments of the Byzantine imperial capital of Constantinople (modern Istanbul, Turkey).

Although in the past attributed to the 14th-century writer George Kodinos, the collection in fact dates from earlier centuries, being probably first compiled ca. 995 in the reign of Basil II (r. 976–1025) and then revised and added to in the reign of Alexios I Komnenos (r. 1081–1118).

The collection contains:
 a part of the patria of the 6th-century pagan writer Hesychius of Miletus, on the history of Byzantium from its foundation to the time where Constantine I refounded it as Constantinople.
 the Parastaseis syntomoi chronikai, which focuses chiefly on the antique sculptures of the city
 another set of patria dating to ca. 995.
 an anonymous Story on the Construction of the Hagia Sophia, written between the late 6th and the late 10th centuries, but more likely at some time in the 9th century.
 a topographical study dedicated to Alexios I.

From an archaeological point of view, the Patria are an invaluable record of the early history of Byzantium and the various monuments of Constantinople. However, their accounts must be examined with care, since they often mix facts with fiction and urban legends. From a political point of view, the Patria are interesting because of their portrayal of the Emperors, who are relatively absent from the account of the imperial city, and are largely confined to a role as "chronological indicators".

References

Sources 
 
 
 
 
 1901 Teubner edition by Theodorus Preger at the Internet Archive volume 1
 1907 Teubner edition by Theodorus Preger at the Internet Archive volume 2

Constantinople
Byzantine culture
Byzantine literature